During World War II, the Italian Expeditionary Corps in Russia (CSIR) was a corps of the Regio Esercito that fought on the Eastern Front. In July 1942 the CSIR entered the newly formed Italian Army in Russia as XXXV Army Corps. On 1 August 1941 the CSIR consisted of the following units:

Italian Expeditionary Corps in Russia 
 Italian Expeditionary Corps in Russia, Commander: Army Corps General Francesco Zingales (until 13 July 1941), Army Corps General Giovanni Messe  (from 16 July 1941)
 Army Corps Headquarters, Chief of Staff: Colonel Guido Piacenza
 33rd Topographic Section
 33rd Artillery Topographic Section
 33rd Photographic Section
 193rd Motorized Royal Carabinieri Section
 194th Motorized Royal Carabinieri Section
 684th Motorized Royal Carabinieri Section
 1st Fuel Section
 Army Corps Command Automobilistic Squad
 Photo-cinematographic Unit
 13th Road Movement Squad
 88th Military Post Office
 Artillery Commander: Brigadier General Francesco Dupont 
 30th Army Corps Artillery Grouping, Commander: Colonel Lorenzo Matiotti
 IV Motorized Anti-aircraft Group (75/46 anti-aircraft cannons)
 XIX Motorized Anti-aircraft Group (75/46 anti-aircraft cannons)
 LX Group (105/32 heavy field guns)
 LXI Group (105/32 heavy field guns)
 LXII Group (105/32 heavy field guns)
 95th Light Anti-aircraft Battery (20/65 anti-aircraft guns)
 97th Light Anti-aircraft Battery (20/65 anti-aircraft guns)
 Engineer Commander: Colonel Mario Tirelli 
 I Chemical Battalion
 I Bridge Engineers Battalion
 IV Sappers Battalion
 VIII Connection Battalion
 102nd Radio Officers Company
 121st Telegraphers Company
 122nd Telegraphers Company
 20th Mobile Dovecote
 IX Bridge Engineers Battalion
 88th Auto-transported Photo-electricians Section
 19th Auto-transported Connection Materials Workshop
 63rd CC.NN. Legione (Regiment) "Tagliamento", Commander Console Niccolò Nicchiarelli
 LXIII CC.NN. Mountain Coorte (Battalion) "Udine"
 LXXIX CC.NN. Assault Coorte (Battalion) "Reggio Emilia"
 LXIII Accompanying Weapons Battalion (Army unit with machine guns and 81mm Mod. 35 mortars)
 CIV Army Corps Machine Gunners Battalion
 Alpini Skiers Battalion "Monte Cervino" (arrived February 1942)
 Command Platoon
 1st Skiers Company
 2nd Skiers Company
 80th Accompanying Weapons Company (Machine guns and 81mm Mod. 35 mortars)
 II Anti-tank Cannons Battalion (47/32 anti-tank cannons)
 1st Bersaglieri Motorcyclists Company

3rd Fast Division "Principe Amedeo Duca d'Aosta" 

  3rd Fast Division "Principe Amedeo Duca d'Aosta", Commander: Brigadier General Mario Marazzani
 Headquarters
 III Photo-cinematographic Group
 355th Motorized Royal Carabinieri Section
 356th Motorized Royal Carabinieri Section
 3rd Fast Division Command Automobilistic Squad
 3rd Road Movement Unit
 40th Military Post Office
 Regiment "Savoia Cavalleria" (3rd), Commander: Colonel Weiss Poccetti
 Headquarters and Regiment Headquarters Company
 I, and II Squadrons Group, each with:
 Headquarters and Squadrons Group Headquarters Squadron
 2x Dragoons squadrons
 3rd Machine Gunners Squadron
 Regiment "Lancieri di Novara" (5th), Commander: Colonel Egidio Giusiana
 Headquarters and Regiment Headquarters Squadron
 I, and II Squadrons Group, each with:
 Headquarters and Squadrons Group Headquarters Squadron
 2x Lancers squadrons
 5th Machine Gunners Squadron
 3rd Bersaglieri Regiment, Commander: Colonel Aminto Caretto
 Headquarters and Regiment Headquarters Company
 XVIII, XX, and XXV Auto-transported Bersaglieri Battalion, each with:
 Headquarters and Battalion Headquarters Company
 3x Bersaglieri companies
 Accompanying Weapons Company (Machine guns and 81mm Mod. 35 mortars)
 XIII "Cavalleggeri di Alessandria" Self-propelled Group (arrived August 1942)
 Headquarters and Group Headquarters Squadron
 2x Self-propelled squadrons (47/32 self-propelled guns)
 2nd Bersaglieri Motorcyclists Company
 3rd Bersaglieri Motorcyclists Company
 122nd Light Transport Unit
 3rd Horse Artillery Regiment, Commander: Colonel Cesare Colombo
 Headquarters and Regiment Headquarters Unit
 I Horse-drawn Group (75/27 Mod. 12 field guns)
 II Horse-drawn Group (75/27 Mod. 12 field guns)
 III Horse-drawn Group (75/27 Mod. 12 field guns) 
 Ammunition and Food Unit
 III Fast Tanks Group "San Giorgio"
 Headquarters and Group Headquarters Company
 2x Tank Companies (L3/35 tankettes)
 172nd Anti-tank Cannons Company (47/32 anti-tank cannons)
 173rd Anti-tank Cannons Company (47/32 anti-tank cannons)
 93rd Light Anti-aircraft Battery (20/65 anti-aircraft guns)
 101st Light Anti-aircraft Battery (20/65 anti-aircraft guns)
 103rd Telegraphers and Radio-telegraphers Engineer Company
 105th Sappers Engineer Company
 73rd Medical Section
 46th Field Hospital
 47th Field Hospital
 148th Field Hospital
 159th Field Hospital
 20th Chirurgical Squad
 93rd Supply Section
 59th Bakers Squad
 3rd Car Repair Workshop
 213rd Mixed Transport Unit

Reorganization March 1942 
In March 1942 the division was reorganized: both cavalry regiments left the division and formed the Mounted Grouping under direct command of the CSIR, while the 3rd Horse Artillery Regiment came under direct command of the CSIR's Artillery Commander. The units were replaced in the division by the following units

 6th Bersaglieri Regiment, Commander: Colonel Umberto Salvatores:
 Headquarters and Regiment Headquarters Company
 VI, XIII, and XIX Auto-transported Bersaglieri Battalion, each with:
 Headquarters and Battalion Headquarters Company
 3x Bersaglieri companies
 Accompanying Weapons Company (Machine guns and 81mm Mod. 35 mortars)
 120th Motorized Artillery Regiment, Commander: Colonel Ugo de Simone
 Headquarters and Regiment Headquarters Unit
 I Motorized Group (100/17 field guns)
 II Motorized Group (75/27 field guns)
 III Motorized Group (75/27 field guns)
 Ammunition and Food Unit
 XLVII Bersaglieri Motorcyclists Battalion
 Headquarters and Battalion Headquarters Company
 3x Bersaglieri motorcyclists companies
 LXVII Armored Bersaglieri Battalion (arrived early summer 1942)
 Headquarters and Battalion Headquarters Company
 2x Tank Companies (L6/40 tanks)
 Divisional Mortar Battalion
 Headquarters and Battalion Headquarters Company
 3x Mortar companies (81mm Mod. 35 mortars))
 75th Anti-tank Cannons Battery (75/39 anti-tank cannons)
 272nd Anti-tank Cannons Company (47/32 anti-tank cannons)
 XIV Heavy Transport Group
 218th Heavy Transport Unit
 219th Heavy Transport Unit

9th Infantry Division "Pasubio" 
The 9th Infantry Division "Pasubio" was an auto-transportable division, which had motorized artillery and support units, while its infantry continued to transport equipment on mules or with carriages.

  9th Infantry Division "Pasubio", Commander: Division General Vittorio Giovanelli
 Headquarters
 I Photo-cinematographic Group
 25th Motorized Royal Carabinieri Section
 26th Motorized Royal Carabinieri Section
 91st Fuel Section
 9th Infantry Division Command Automobilistic Squad
 8th Road Movement Squad
 9th Road Rescue Squad
 83rd Military Post Office
  79th Infantry Regiment "Pasubio", Commander: Colonel Rocco Blasioli
 Headquarters and Regiment Headquarters Company
 Mortar Company (81mm Mod. 35 mortars)
 Accompanying Cannons Battery (65/17 mountain guns)
 I, II, and III Infantry Battalion, each with:
 Headquarters and Battalion Headquarters Company
 3x Fusiliers companies
 Accompanying Weapons Company (Machine guns and 45mm Mod. 35 mortars)
 80th Infantry Regiment "Pasubio", Commander: Colonel Epifanio Chiaramonti
 Headquarters and Regiment Headquarters Company
 Mortar Company (81mm Mod. 35 mortars)
 Accompanying Cannons Battery (65/17 mountain guns)
 I, II, and III Infantry Battalion, each with:
 Headquarters and Battalion Headquarters Company
 3x Fusiliers companies
 Accompanying Weapons Company (Machine guns and 45mm Mod. 35 mortars)
 8th Artillery Regiment "Pasubio", Commander: Colonel Alfredo Reginella
 Headquarters and Regiment Headquarters Unit
 I Motorized Group (100/17 field guns)
 II Motorized Group (75/27 field guns)
 III Motorized Group (75/27 field guns)
 Ammunition and Food Unit
 V Mortar Battalion (81mm Mod. 35 mortars)
 IX Mortar Battalion (81mm Mod. 35 mortars)
 9th Anti-tank Cannons Company (47/32 anti-tank cannons)
 141st Anti-tank Cannons Company (47/32 anti-tank cannons)
 85th Light Anti-aircraft Battery (20/65 anti-aircraft guns)
 309th Light Anti-aircraft Battery (20/65 anti-aircraft guns)
 9th Telegraphers and Radio-telegraphers Engineer Company
 30th Sappers Engineer Company
 95th Photo-electricians Section
 5th Medical Section
 825th Field Hospital
 826th Field Hospital
 836th Field Hospital
 874th Field Hospital
 25th Chirurgical Squad
 11th Supply Section
 26th Bakers Squad
 9th Car Repair Workshop

52nd Infantry Division "Torino" 
The 52nd Infantry Division "Torino" was an auto-transportable division, which had motorized artillery and support units, while its infantry continued to transport equipment on mules or with carriages.

  52nd Infantry Division "Torino", Commander: Division General Luigi Manzi
 Headquarters
 II Photo-cinematographic Group
 56th Motorized Royal Carabinieri Section
 66th Motorized Royal Carabinieri Section
 52nd Fuel Section
 52nd Infantry Division Command Automobilistic Squad
 5th Road Movement Squad
 52nd Road Rescue Squad
 152nd Military Post Office
 81st Infantry Regiment "Torino", Commander: Colonel Carlo Piccinini
 Headquarters and Regiment Headquarters Company
 Mortar Company (81mm Mod. 35 mortars)
 Accompanying Cannons Battery (65/17 mountain guns)
 I, II, and III Infantry Battalion, each with:
 Headquarters and Battalion Headquarters Company
 3x Fusiliers companies
 Accompanying Weapons Company (Machine guns and 45mm Mod. 35 mortars)
 82nd Infantry Regiment "Torino", Commander: Colonel Evaristo Fioravanti
 Headquarters and Regiment Headquarters Company
 Mortar Company (81mm Mod. 35 mortars)
 Accompanying Cannons Battery (65/17 mountain guns)
 I, II, and III Infantry Battalion, each with:
 Headquarters and Battalion Headquarters Company
 3x Fusiliers companies
 Accompanying Weapons Company (Machine guns and 45mm Mod. 35 mortars)
 52nd Artillery Regiment "Torino", Commander: Colonel Giuseppe Ghiringhelli
 Headquarters and Regiment Headquarters Unit
 I Motorized Group (100/17 field guns)
 II Motorized Group (75/27 field guns)
 III Motorized Group (75/27 field guns)
 Ammunition and Food Unit
 XXVI Mortar Battalion (81mm Mod. 35 mortars)
 LII Mortar Battalion (81mm Mod. 35 mortars)
 52nd Anti-tank Cannons Company (47/32 anti-tank cannons)
 171st Anti-tank Cannons Company (47/32 anti-tank cannons)
 352nd Light Anti-aircraft Battery (20/65 anti-aircraft guns)
 361st Light Anti-aircraft Battery (20/65 anti-aircraft guns)
 52nd Telegraphers and Radiotelegraphers Engineer Company
 57th Sappers Engineer Company
 69th Photo-electricians Section
 52nd Medical Section
 89th Field Hospital
 90th Field Hospital
 117th Field Hospital
 578th Field Hospital
 52nd Chirurgical Squad
 52nd Supply Section
 65th Bakers Squad
 52nd Car Repair Workshop

CSIR Aviation Command 
The Regia Aeronautica dispatched the following units to Russia:

 CSIR Aviation Command, Commander: Colonel Carlo Drago
 LXI Observation Group 
 34th Observation Flight (Ca.311 reconnaissance aircraft)
 119th Observation Flight (Ca.311 reconnaissance aircraft)
 128th Observation Flight (Ca.311 reconnaissance aircraft)
 XXII Fighter Group 
 359th Fighter Flight (MC.200 fighter aircraft)
 362nd Fighter Flight (MC.200 fighter aircraft)
 369th Fighter Flight (MC.200 fighter aircraft)
 371st Fighter Flight (MC.200 fighter aircraft)
 245th Transport Flight (SM.81 transport aircraft)
 246th Transport Flight (SM.81 transport aircraft)
 1st, 2nd, 3rd, 4th, 5th, and 6th Airport Defense Section ((20/65 anti-aircraft guns))
 Car Park, with around 300 vehicles

Logistic Services 
The following logistic and support units were attached to the corps:

 2nd Army Transport Grouping, Commander: Colonel Ginesio Ninchi
 II Mixed Transport Group
 26th Heavy Transport Unit
 32nd Heavy Transport Unit
 51st Ambulances Transport Unit
 91st Heavy Transport Unit
 116th Light Transport Unit
 228th Mixed Transport Unit
 XXIX Heavy Transport Group
 33rd Heavy Transport Unit
 34th Heavy Transport Unit
 96th Heavy Transport Unit
 97th Heavy Transport Unit
 14th Medical Section
 Field Hospitals: 60th, 64th, 163rd, 164th, 235th, 238th, 239th, 256th, 257th, 820th, 827th, 828th, 829th, 830th, 831st, 837th, 838th, 873rd
 2nd Disinfection Section
 25th Disinfection Section
 2nd Gas Victims Recovery Section
 104th Gas Victims Recovery Section
 1st Radiological Ambulance
 2nd Radiological Ambulance
 14th Dentistry Ambulance
 Chemical, Bacteriological, Toxicological Laboratory
 2nd Quadruped Infirmary
 6th Quadruped Infirmary
 19th Bakers Section
 87th Supply Section
 23rd Bakers Squad
 82nd Quartermaster Unit
 15th Transport Group Workshop
 13th Road Rescue Unit
 8th Road Rescue Squad

References 

World War II orders of battle
Army corps of Italy in World War II
Expeditionary units and formations
Military units and formations established in 1941
Military units and formations disestablished in 1942
Military units and formations of the Soviet–German War